Hugh Thom Barrie PC (Ire) (6 August 1860–18 April 1922) was a Scottish-born businessman and unionist politician who was Member of Parliament for North Londonderry from 1906 until his death, with a short break after the 1918 general election. "Though not a noted orator on the level of [Edward] Carson, his industrious nature, popular touch and work ethic, coupled with his Scottish connections, enabled Barrie to play a vital role" in Ulster unionist opposition to Irish Home Rule.

Business and family life
Barrie was born in Glasgow to William Barrie and came to Coleraine in 1879. He worked in an agricultural export business and took it over in 1894. 

In 1892 Barrie married Katherine Quarry, daughter of W. H. Quarry of the Methodist Church in Ireland. He himself was Presbyterian. They had three sons and one daughter, including Sir Walter Barrie (1901–1988), a chairman of the Chartered Insurance Institute and Lloyd's of London.

Politics
Barrie was a Coleraine town commissioner from 1889 and urban district councillor from 1899, chairing the council for several years. He was a prominent Freemason and Orangeman and supported women's suffrage. He was elected to Westminster in 1906 and retained his seat in January 1910 and December 1910. He promoted the Ulster Covenant and led the Ulster unionist delegation at the 1917–18 Irish Convention. In 1918 he was High Sheriff of County Londonderry and lest this be considered an office of profit disqualifying him from the Commons he did not stand in the December 1918 election. Hugh Anderson, Barrie's election agent, was elected in his stead, standing down in February 1919, with Barrie regaining his seat in the ensuing by-election on 4 March. 

Barrie was Vice-President of the Irish Department of Agriculture and Technical Instruction from 1919 to November 1921, for which he was appointed the Privy Council of Ireland in the 1920 Birthday Honours, entitling him to the style "The Right Honourable". He was also a member of the Senate of Northern Ireland.

References
Obituary, The Times, 19 April 1922

Citations

External links 
 

1860 births
1922 deaths
Politicians from Glasgow
People from Coleraine, County Londonderry
Businesspeople from Northern Ireland
UK MPs 1906–1910
UK MPs 1910
UK MPs 1910–1918
UK MPs 1918–1922
Members of the Parliament of the United Kingdom for County Londonderry constituencies (1801–1922)
Members of the Senate of Northern Ireland 1921–1925
Ulster Unionist Party members of the House of Commons of the United Kingdom
Irish Unionist Party MPs
Members of the Privy Council of Ireland
Ulster Unionist Party members of the Senate of Northern Ireland
Businesspeople in agriculture